Susan Jean Friedlander (née Poate; born January 26, 1946) is an American mathematician. Her research concerns mathematical fluid dynamics, the Euler equations and the Navier-Stokes equations.

Education
Friedlander graduated from University College, London with a BS in Mathematics in 1967. She was awarded a Kennedy Scholarship to study at MIT, where she earned an MS in 1970. She completed her doctorate in 1972 from Princeton University under the supervision of Louis Norberg Howard.

Career
From 1972–1974, Friedlander was a Visiting Member at the Courant Institute of Mathematical Sciences, followed by a year as an instructor at Princeton University. In 1975, she joined the faculty in the Mathematics department at the University of Illinois at Chicago. In 2007, she moved to the University of Southern California where she is Professor of Mathematics and the Director of the Center for Applied Mathematical Sciences.

Service
From 1996–2010, Friedlander served as an officer of the American Mathematical Society in the role of Associate Secretary. In 2005, she was appointed the first female Editor-in-Chief of the Bulletin of the American Mathematical Society. Her other leadership activities include membership of the Scientific Advisory Committee of the Mathematical Sciences Research Institute (2001–2006), the Board of Mathematical Sciences and their Applications (2008–2011), the Section A Steering Committee of the American Association for the Advancement of Science (2013–2015), and the MIT Mathematics Department Visiting Committee (2013–2021). She is currently the Chair of the Mathematical Council of the Americas.

Honors and awards
1967–1969 Kennedy Scholarship, MIT
1993 N.S.F Visiting Professorship for Women, Brown University
1995 Elected Honorary Member, Moscow Mathematical Society
1998 Medal of the Institute Henri Poincare
2003 Senior Scholar Award, University of Illinois at Chicago
2012 Fellow, Society for Industrial and Applied Mathematics
2012 Fellow, the American Association for the Advancement of Science
2012 Fellow, the American Mathematical Society

Personal
Friedlander is married to mathematician Eric Friedlander.

References

External links
Home page

1946 births
Living people
American women mathematicians
Alumni of the University of London
Massachusetts Institute of Technology alumni
Princeton University alumni
University of Illinois Chicago faculty
University of Southern California faculty
20th-century American mathematicians
21st-century American  mathematicians
Fellows of the American Association for the Advancement of Science
Fellows of the American Mathematical Society
Fellows of the Society for Industrial and Applied Mathematics
20th-century women mathematicians
21st-century women mathematicians
20th-century American women scientists
21st-century American women scientists